Pseudocyclopidae is a family of copepods belonging to the order Calanoida.

Genera

Genera:
 Badijella Krsinic, 2005
 Boholina Fosshagen, 1989
 Brattstromia Fosshagen, 1991

References

Copepods